J'ai quelque chose à vous dire is a French film from 1931. It was film director Marc Allégret's second film short, the first being La Meilleure bobone, released a year earlier.

Plot
Pierre Deneige (played by Fernandel), well known as a scoundrel, is the lover of a married woman (played by Colette Clauday), and goes to visit her. However, when he arrives the woman (who he assumes to be his lover) inside the apartment he goes into tells him of another lover, making Pierre think that she is being unfaithful to him. However, it turns out he is on the wrong floor, and has been talking to the wrong woman. He goes upstairs and is confronted by his lover's husband.

Cast (as credited)
 Fernandel : Pierre Deneige
 Colette Clauday : la femme
 Pierre Darteuil : le mari
 Paulette Dubost : la femme de chambre

References

External links

French short films
1931 short films
French black-and-white films
Films directed by Marc Allégret
1930s French-language films
1930s French films